Harald Tusberg (born 6 April 1935 in Bergen) is a Norwegian former television personality. He was host of many Norwegian Broadcasting Corporation programs, including the Norwegian version of This Is Your Life and the Eurovision Song Contest. Tusberg was also a screenwriter, songwriter, and author. In 1996, he suffered a stroke which forced him to retire.

External links

1935 births
Living people
Norwegian television personalities
NRK people